Jacques Doillon (born 15 March 1944) is a French film director. He has a habit of giving lead roles to inexperienced young actresses in his films on family life and women. Some actresses to break through are Fanny Bastien, Sandrine Bonnaire, Judith Godrèche, Marianne Denicourt, Charlotte Gainsbourg and Juliette Binoche.

Doillon was born in Paris. He has two daughters: Lola Doillon (born 1975), whose mother is film editor Noëlle Boisson, and Lou Doillon (born 1982), from his relationship with English actress Jane Birkin in the 1980s. He has three other children named Lili, Lina, and Lazare.

His 1989 film The 15 Year Old Girl was entered into the 16th Moscow International Film Festival.

His 1990 film La vengeance d'une femme was entered into the 40th Berlin International Film Festival. The following year, his film Le Petit Criminel won an Honourable Mention at the 41st Berlin International Film Festival. In 1993, his film Le Jeune Werther won the Blue Angel Award at the 43rd Berlin International Film Festival. In 1998, his film Trop (peu) d'amour was entered into the 48th Berlin International Film Festival.

Filmography

 Trial (1969 documentary short)
 Vitesse oblige (1970 documentary short)
 La Voiture électronique (1970 documentary short)
 Tous risques (1971 documentary short)
 On ne se dit pas tout entre époux (1971 short)
 Bol d'or (1971 documentary short)
 The Year 01 (1973) - cast in Gérard Depardieu, Thierry Lhermitte, Patrice Leconte...
 Autour des filets (1973 short)
 Les Demi-jours (1973 documentary short)
 Laissés pour compte (1973 documentary short)
 Touched in the Head (1974)
 A Bag of Marbles (1975)
 La Drôlesse (1979)
 The Crying Woman (1979)
 La Fille prodigue (1981) - starring Jane Birkin, Michel Piccoli
 L'Arbre (1982 TV movie) - starring Jeanne Moreau
 Monsieur Abel (1983 TV movie)
 La Pirate (1984) - starring Jane Birkin, Maruschka Detmers, Andrew Birkin, Laure Marsac
 La tentation d'Isabelle (1985) - Jacques Bonnaffé
 Mangui, onze ans peut-être (1985 TV documentary)
 La Vie de famille (1985) - starring Sami Frey Juliet Berto Juliette Binoche
 La Puritaine (1986) - Sandrine Bonnaire, Michel Piccoli, Sabine Azéma
 Comédie ! (1987) - starring Jane Birkin and Alain Souchon
 L'Amoureuse (1988) - Marianne Denicourt, Agnès Jaoui, Eva Ionesco, Dominic Gould
 Pour un oui ou pour un non (1990 TV movie) - Jean-Louis Trintignant and André Dussollier
 La fille de quinze ans (1989) - with Judith Godrèche, Melvil Poupaud
 Le Petit criminel (1990)  - starring Richard Anconina Clotilde Courau
 La vengeance d'une femme (1990) - Isabelle Huppert and Béatrice Dalle
 Contre l'oubli (1991) - segment "Pour Anstraum Aman Villagran Morales, Guatémala"
 Amoureuse (1992) starring Charlotte Gainsbourg, Yvan Attal
 L'Homme à la mer (1993 TV movie) starring Jacques Higelin, Marie Gillain
 Le Jeune Werther (1993)
 Du fond du cœur (1994) starring Benoît Régent, Anne Brochet
 Un siècle d'écrivains (TV series documentary) - segment Nathalie Sarraute (1995)
 Ponette (1996) starring Victoire Thivisol, Marie Trintignant
 Trop (peu) d'amour (1998) starring Lambert Wilson
 Petits frères (1999)
 Carrément à l'Ouest (2001)
 Raja (2003) starring Pascal Greggory
 Le premier venu (2008)
 Le Mariage à trois (2010)
 Mes séances de lutte (2013)
 Rodin (2017)

References

External links
 

1944 births
Living people
Film directors from Paris
Birkin family